The 2000–01 USC Trojans men's basketball team represented the University of Southern California during the 2000–01 NCAA Division I men's basketball season. Led by head coach Henry Bibby, they played their home games at the L. A. Sports Arena in Los Angeles, California as members of the Pac-10 Conference. The Trojans finished the season with a record of 24–10 (11–7 Pac-10) and made a run to the Elite Eight of the NCAA tournament.

Roster

Schedule and results

|-
!colspan=9 style=| Non-conference regular season

|-
!colspan=9 style=| Pac-10 regular season

|-
!colspan=9 style=| NCAA Tournament

Rankings

Team Players in the 2001 NBA draft

References

Usc Trojans
USC Trojans men's basketball seasons
USC
USC Trojans
USC Trojans